The Denver Bears (also periodically known as the Grizzlies, Mountaineers or Mountain Lions) were a minor league baseball team from Denver, Colorado, that played primarily in the Western League. They were founded in 1885 and played in the Colorado State League before moving to the Western League a year later and also adopting a team name. The franchise began playing at Larimer Street Baseball Park and played at a few other ballparks before ultimately moving to Mile High Stadium. The 1911 Grizzlies were recognized as one of the 100 greatest minor league teams of all time. The Bears were affiliated with four MLB teams from 1932 to 1954 before being replaced in 1955 by an American Association team of the same name that would eventually relocate to New Orleans, Louisiana, in 1993.

History

Notable alumni
Joe Tinker

Season-by-season

References

External links
Baseball Reference

Defunct Western League teams
Defunct Western Association teams
Defunct Colorado State League teams
St. Louis Cardinals minor league affiliates
New York Yankees minor league affiliates
Boston Braves minor league affiliates
Pittsburgh Pirates minor league affiliates
Baseball teams established in 1885
Baseball teams disestablished in 1954
1885 establishments in Colorado
1954 disestablishments in Colorado
Sports teams in Denver
Defunct baseball teams in Colorado